2016 Gaziantep bombing may refer to:

 May 2016 Gaziantep bombing
 August 2016 Gaziantep bombing